Joanne Palombo-McCallie (born Joanne Elizabeth Palombo; September 6, 1965) is an American college basketball coach and advocate for mental health who most recently served as the head coach of the Duke University women's basketball team.

McCallie became the first Division I head coach to win a conference title in four different conferences (the ACC, Big Ten, America East and North Atlantic), and also the first Division I coach to be named conference coach of the year in four different conferences. She was only the second Division I head coach to lead two different programs to 30-win seasons, and also to lead two different programs to a No. 1 seed in the NCAA tournament. McCallie has three National Championship game appearances in her career (one as a head coach and two as an assistant), and has been named conference coach of the year five times. She has coached twelve players who have received All-America honors, and at Duke alone, sixteen players have gone on to play professionally, six being first-round picks. 

McCallie has also won a gold medal as coach of the 2006 U20 National team and the 2007 U21 World Championship team. Since her first season at Duke in 2007, McCallie has led the Women's basketball team to an overall record of 141–32, a 60–12 record in the ACC alone, and was announced the ACC Coach of the year in 2010 and 2012.

Coaching career

Duke

McCallie was named head coach at Duke on April 18, 2007, replacing Gail Goestenkors, who had left to coach at Texas. McCallie won 82 games in her first three years at Duke. For a coach in her first three years at a Division I school, this was the second-most wins in NCAA Division I history. McCallie reached 100 wins at Duke in only 122 games, being the second-quickest to ever reach 100 wins at a school. In only four years, the Blue Devils had a record of 114–26 overall, a 45–11 conference record, and four NCAA Tournament selections, including a No. 1 seed in 2009 and Elite Eight appearances in 2010 and 2011. In her first season at Duke in 2007–2008, McCallie led Duke to its 10th straight 25-win season with an appearance in the ACC Championship game and a trip to the NCAA Tournament Sweet 16 which marked the 11th consecutive appearance in the regional semifinals for the program. In her fourth season, McCallie guided Duke to its seventh ACC Championship, 10th regular season ACC title in school history along with an appearance in the NCAA Elite Eight. During this season McCallie also had her second straight 30-win season at Duke, including a 17–0 mark at home in Cameron Indoor Stadium; the third undefeated campaign at home in Duke's school history and the second under McCallie. Most recently, McCallie has led the Blue Devils to the 2010 and 2011 ACC Championship, which marked the sixth and seventh overall conference titles in school history. She led Duke to its ninth 30-win season out of the last 11 years, and in 2010–2011 led Duke to a 17–0 record at home; marking just the third time in school history the Blue Devils have gone undefeated in Cameron Indoor Stadium in one season. Additionally, McCallie recorded a 10-2 record for the ACC/Big Ten Challenge while at Duke. 

McCallie's teams were major competitors in the NCAA Tournament. McCallie led her team to seven Sweet Sixteen games and four straight Elite Eights. 

During her tenure at Duke, McCallie dealt with an investigation related to concerns about player transfers and the atmosphere. The former Duke vice president and director of athletics, Kevin White released a statement in support of McCallie, “Joanne P. McCallie is and will be, our head women’s basketball coach and we support her."  

In August 2017, following a season where McCallie led her team to be ranked ninth in the nation and the second round of the NCAA Tournament, Duke extended her contract through the 2020–21 season.

McCallie closed out what would be her final season (2019/2020) ranked third in the ACC. The postseason was canceled due to the COVID-19 pandemic. On July 2, 2020, McCallie announced that she would not return to Duke for the 2020-2021 season after 13 seasons with the school.

On February 16, 2021, McCallie released her second book 'Secret Warrior', a memoir that chronicled her battle with a bipolar diagnosis. She currently is speaking and working as an advocate for those facing mental health issues.

Michigan State
McCallie spent seven years as the head coach at Michigan State University in the Big Ten Conference. While with the Spartans, she led the team to 149 wins and 75 losses (.670), including five straight NCAA tournament appearances (2003–2007). McCallie had an overall record of 316–148 (.681) and 11 NCAA tournament appearances. She replaced Karen Langeland, who retired following 24 years as the head coach at MSU.

During the 2004/2005 season, Michigan State won its first Big Ten Tournament championship, beating Minnesota in the title game and McCallie led MSU to their first NCAA Championship game  Michigan State beat Tennessee (3) in a historic national semifinals game, coming back from a 16-point deficit, and went on to lose to Baylor in the championship game. Additionally, McCallie was named the 2005 National Coach of the Year by the Associated Press and Basketball Times. Michigan State played one of the nation's toughest schedules, playing 20 of its games against teams that reached the NCAA Tournament (16-4 record in those 20 games).  

While at MSU, McCallie also led the 2006 USA Basketball U20 National Team to a FIBA Americas U20 Championship and gold medal, and was selected to coach the 2007 USA Basketball Women's U21 Team in the FIBA World Championship under 21 for women. McCallie left Michigan State after accepting the head coach position at Duke University in 2007.

Maine
Prior to her time at MSU, McCallie spent eight years as the head coach at the University of Maine. During her tenure with the Black Bears, McCallie guided Maine to a record of 167–73, six-straight NCAA Tournament appearances, four North Atlantic Conference/America East Conference Championships and five regular-season conference titles. McCallie guided the Black Bears to seven-straight 20-win campaigns, including a 20–11 overall record in 1999–2000. She was named conference coach of the year three times, twice in the North Atlantic Conference (1995 and 1996) and once in the America East (1999).
McCallie left Maine as the school's all-time winningest women's basketball coach with 167 victories.

Auburn
Prior to taking her first head coaching position, McCallie was an assistant coach at Auburn University from 1988–92. As the team's primary recruiter, she helped sign the fourth-ranked class in the nation in 1990–91 and the 16th-ranked class in 1991–92. While at Auburn, McCallie and the Tigers appeared in two national championship games and made an appearance in the NCAA Elite Eight.

Coaching honors
National Coach of the Year by the Associated Press, Basketball Times and Nike, Inc. (2005)
Basketball Coaches Association of Michigan College Coach of the Year (2005)
Atlantic Coast Conference Coach of the Year (2010, 2012)
North Atlantic Conference Coach of the Year (1995, 1996)
America East Conference Coach of the Year (1999)
Big Ten Coach of the Year (2005)
 New England Basketball Hall of Fame (2004)
11 NCAA tournament appearances as head coach (Maine: 1995–2000; Michigan State: 2003–2007)
Five conference championships (Maine: 1995–99; Michigan State: 2005)
FIBA Americas U-20 Gold Medal, 2006
Fiba World U-21 Gold Medal, 2007

Playing career
McCallie, then named Palombo, played Big Ten collegiate basketball at Northwestern University from 1984 – 1987. She still ranks seventh in Wildcat history with 378 career assists. As a senior, she was an All-Big Ten honorable mention selection and helped lead the Wildcats to the second round of the NCAA Tournament. McCallie also was named Academic All-Big Ten First-Team as a senior, and graduated in 1987 with a B.S. in political science. She earned a M.A. in business administration while coaching at Auburn in 1990. McCallie was inducted into the Maine Sports Legends Hall of Honors in 2005.

In 1983, representing Brunswick High, Palombo became the first player ever from Maine named to Parade Magazine's annual All-America High School girls´ basketball team.

Personal life
McCallie is the daughter of a Navy pilot, born in Monterey, CA and raised in Florida, New York, Texas, Rhode Island, and finally Maine, where her Mother (Father passed in 2021) and family still live. Fred Koerber, her high school coach, was the first person to suggest that she think about coaching someday, but it was years later at Auburn before she acted on the suggestion.

McCallie is an active speaker within the community and for women's athletics. At MSU, McCallie created the "Choice Not Chance" philosophy, which focuses on making the correct choices in life. The philosophy has been widely used by McCallie, her staff and players, who have been very active in the area schools speaking about "CNC".

In addition, McCallie's community service includes working with the Big Brothers Big Sisters "Jump" program; serving as the Honorary Chair for the Haven House — a shelter for homeless families in East Lansing, Michigan; serving as the Honorary Chair for the 2001 Crop Walk and the 2001–04 Memory Walks for Alzheimer's; and holding the Joanne P. McCallie Golf Challenge benefiting children and adolescents with cancer.

While at Maine, she organized an event called "Realizing the Dream; Celebrating Women in Athletics" that featured speakers Dr. Donna Lopiano and Sheryl Swoopes. During the 1997–98 season, Dana Rae Warren filmed a documentary of the Maine women's basketball season.

Joanne and her husband, John McCallie, Ph.D. and former professor of economics at the University of North Carolina at Chapel Hill, have a daughter, Madeline (Maddie, born in 1994), and a son, John Wyatt (Jack, born in 2000).

John McCallie's grandfather and grand-uncle, Spencer Jarnigan McCallie and James Park McCallie, were the founders of The McCallie School, a preparatory school for boys in Chattanooga, Tennessee. John's great-aunt Grace McCallie was one of the founders of the Girls Preparatory School, also in Chattanooga.

Head coaching record

Sources: America East Big Ten ACC

References

External links
 Duke biography 
 MSU biography 
 USA Women's Basketball 

1965 births
Living people
American women's basketball coaches
Auburn Tigers women's basketball coaches
Basketball coaches from California
Basketball coaches from Maine
Basketball players from California
Basketball players from Maine
Duke Blue Devils women's basketball coaches
Maine Black Bears women's basketball coaches
Michigan State Spartans women's basketball coaches
Northwestern Wildcats women's basketball players
Parade High School All-Americans (girls' basketball)
People from Brunswick, Maine
Sportspeople from Monterey, California
Guards (basketball)
Brunswick High School (Maine) alumni